Harry Christian Giese  (9 December 1913 – 4 February 2000) administered Australian federal government policy for the people of the Northern Territory under Prime Ministers including Robert Menzies and Harold Holt and Ministers including Paul Hasluck.

Biography and career 
Giese was a third-generation descendant of a German family who migrated to Australia in the 1870s.
In 1954, after senior public service jobs in Western Australia and Queensland, he moved to Darwin as the Director of Welfare in the Northern Territory Administration.
He was the longest-serving member of the Northern Territory Legislative Council, from 1954 to 1973. In 1978, after Territory self-government, he became the first Northern Territory Ombudsman.

As founding Chairman of the NT Committee of the Menzies Foundation he was instrumental in the establishment of the Menzies School of Health Research, serving on its Board of Governors and as Deputy Chairman from 1985 to 1995. The School is now one of Australia's leading medical research institutes, and a global leader in tropical research into life-threatening illnesses. Harry Giese's obituary in the Menzies Foundation Annual Report 1999 said that ‘the continuing contribution made...to the health of northern Australians is a tribute to the vision, the enthusiasm and the advocacy of Harry Giese, who first identified the need for such a School, and who later vigorously pursued its establishment and strongly supported its work.'

He was made a Member of the Order of Australia and an Honorary Fellow of the University of Sydney.

Giese was Foundation President and honorary Life Member of numerous community service and sporting organisations, including the Royal Life Saving Society Australia, Darwin Probus Club, Darwin Disaster Welfare Council after the 1974 destruction of Cyclone Tracy, and the Institute of Public Administration.

References

Further reading 

H.C. Giese, Director of Welfare, Partnership towards Aboriginal Progress, in Focus 70 supplement, Northern Territory News, March 1970
Personal papers relating to government administration in welfare and Aboriginal affairs, 1929–86, NTRS 1043/P1, Northern Territory Archives Service, Darwin
Welfare Branch Annual Reports, 1954–1972, Northern Territory Administration, AGPS, Canberra at 15 Australian libraries; see http://trove.nla.gov.au/work/12488134?versionId=14755357
Harry Giese, interviews April 1987 – September 1991, NTRS 226, TS 755, Northern Territory Archives Service, Darwin
Menzies Foundation Annual Reports, including pages 11-13 of the 1999 Annual Report
Annual Reports and President's Report of community organisations such as the Royal Life Saving Society at https://www.royallifesaving.com.au/nt/About-Royal-Life-Saving-NT
Menzies School of Health Research, 30 years of supporting Indigenous health and medical research https://www.menziesfoundation.org.au/menzies-legacy-projects/health-research, https://www.menzies.edu.au/page/Menzies_30th/Our_Journey, https://www.menzies.edu.au/page/About_Us/Achievements/

1913 births
2000 deaths
Society in the Northern Territory
Australian public servants
Ombudsmen in Australia
Members of the Northern Territory Legislative Council
Members of the Order of Australia
Members of the Order of the British Empire
Administrators of the Northern Territory
Northern Territory politicians
Northern Territory federal politicians
20th-century Australian politicians